Piotr Jegor  (13 June 1968 – 17 March 2020) was a Polish professional footballer who played for Górnik Zabrze and Odra Wodzisław Śląski in the Polish Ekstraklasa.

Jegor has made 20 appearances for the Poland national football team, scoring one goal against Latvia.

Career statistics

International goals
Scores and results list. Poland's goal tally first.

References

External links
 
 
 

1968 births
2020 deaths
Polish footballers
Poland international footballers
Górnik Zabrze players
Stal Mielec players
Odra Wodzisław Śląski players
Hapoel Haifa F.C. players
Polish expatriate footballers
Expatriate footballers in Israel
Polish expatriate sportspeople in Israel
People from Tarnowskie Góry County
Sportspeople from Silesian Voivodeship
Association football defenders